Alessandrino is an underground station of Line C of the Rome Metro. It is located along the Via Casilina, at the intersection with Viale Alessandrino and Piazza Sor Capanna, between the Don Bosco and Alessandrino districts.

Construction of the station began in 2007, and the stop itself was opened on 9 November 2014.

References

External links

Rome Metro Line C stations
Railway stations opened in 2014
2014 establishments in Italy
Rome Q. XXIII Alessandrino
Rome Q. XXIV Don Bosco
Railway stations in Italy opened in the 21st century